Cannibal Culture: Art, Appropriation and the Commodification of Difference is a book by Deborah Root, published in 1995 by Westview Press.

The book studies the assimilation of various cultures by other, dominant cultures, and the false assumptions this produces in perceptions of the less dominant culture or ethnicity.

Reviews
 
 

Cultural assimilation